General elections were held in Oman on 4 October 2003 for the mainly advisory Consultative Assembly of Oman. As political parties were banned, all candidates for the 83 seats ran as independents.

2003
2003 elections in Asia
Election
Non-partisan elections